Itai Maggidi (born 9 January 1981) is an Israeli long-distance runner who specializes in the 3000 metres steeplechase.

Biography
Itai Maggidi is Jewish.  He attended Clemson University.

Sports career
Itai Maggidi finished 6th at the 2000 World Junior Championships, 11th at the 2006 European Championships and 12th (in the 3000 metres) at the 2007 European Indoor Championships. He also competed at the 2007 World Championships and competed on behalf of Israel at the 2008 Summer Olympics in Beijing, China, in the 2008 Olympic Games 3000 metre steeplechase without reaching the final.

His personal best time is 8:24.14 minutes, achieved in July 2008 in Longeville-lès-Metz. This is the Israeli record. He also has 3:41.73 minutes in the 1500 metres, achieved in August 2003 in Heusden-Zolder; 7:55.42 minutes in the 3000 metres (indoor), achieved at the 2007 European Indoor Championships in Birmingham; and 29:29.34 minutes in the 10,000 metres, achieved in March 2006 in Palo Alto.

Competition record

See also
 List of Israeli records in athletics
 Sports in Israel

References

External links
 

1981 births
Living people
Israeli male long-distance runners
Athletes (track and field) at the 2008 Summer Olympics
Olympic athletes of Israel
Jewish male athletes (track and field)
Israeli Jews
Male steeplechase runners
World Athletics Championships athletes for Israel
Israeli steeplechase runners